"Marryuna" is a song by Australian musician Baker Boy featuring Yirrmal, released independently on 6 October 2017.

The song ranked at number 17 in Triple J's Hottest 100 of 2017.

At the AIR Awards of 2018, the Baker Boy won Breakthrough Independent Artist with "Marryuna", while the song was nominated for Best Independent Single or EP.

At the Music Victoria Awards of 2018 "Marryuna" won Best Song.

At the National Indigenous Music Awards 2018, the song was nominated for Best Song, while the video won Film Clip of the Year.

Background
Upon release, Baker said: "'Marryuna' means to dance with no shame, to freestyle for the sheer elation of dancing."
pp

Reception
Molly McLaughlin from Purple Sneakers said "'Marryuna' is a danceable party track that incorporates influences from previous generations of Indigenous artists alongside contemporary hip-hop. With a pulsing bass line and bouncy synths, the production is crowded and dynamic in the best way, matching Baker Boy's raucous energy. He can alternate between slow grooves and rapid-fire raps with ease, and carries the audience along with his aura of fearless confidence."

Apple Music said "Seamlessly slipping between English and his native Yolŋu Matha, Marryuna' is a brilliant, infectious, and incredibly welcome addition to modern Australian music."

References

2017 singles
2017 songs
Baker Boy songs
Songs about Australia
Songs written by Baker Boy
Songs written by Jerome Farah
Songs written by Yirrmal
Yirrmal songs
Yolngu-language songs